Creglingen is a town in the Main-Tauber district of Baden-Württemberg, Germany. It has around 4,700 inhabitants.

Geography

Subdivision
The town Creglingen contains the following districts (since the municipal reform of 1972): Archshofen, Blumweiler, Craintal, Erdbach, Finsterlohr (together with the villages Schonach, Burgstall and Seldeneck), Frauental, Freudenbach, Münster, Niederrimbach, Oberrimbach, Lichtel, Reinsbronn (together with the village of Niedersteinach), Reutsachsen, Schirmbach, Schmerbach, Schön, Schwarzenbronn, Waldmannshofen (together with the village of Sechselbach and the hamlets Fuchshof und Seewiesenhof), Wolfsbuch, Weiler.

History

The Celts who founded the town between 200 and 100 B.C. also farmed the surrounding plateaus and valleys. In 1349, Creglingen received its town charter from Emperor Karl IV (Charles IV).

Attractions
Creglingen is known for the Herrgottskirche outside of the town. It contains a masterwork of late-Gothic sculpture by Tilman Riemenschneider, the Marienaltar. The church is a pilgrimage chapel, established following a reported discovery of an undamaged communion wafer by a peasant ploughing his field in 1384. This wafer was thought to be the cause of miracles and people flocked to the site. The local lords, Konrad and Gottfried von Hohenlohe-Brauneck, had a Gothic chapel built in 1386–96. At the pilgrimage's peak around 1500 a number of altars were ordered that remain in the church today. The central altar by Riemenschneider was built on the spot where the wafer was reportedly found. The figures are made from the wood of linden trees, the surrounding frames from pine trees. At a total height of 11 meters the altar dominated the small church. Although Reformation reached the area in 1530, its iconoclasm spared the local church. The altar wings of the main altar were closed, however, as the depicted Assumption of Mary was offensive to the Protestant congregations. Its good state of preservation is owed to the fact that the wings of the altar remained closed and the whole was covered by funeral wreaths until 1832.

Notable people
 Crago (Alamanni)), mythical founder
 Gustav Vorherr (1778-1847), architect and economist, Royal Bavarian Baurat 
  (1835-1896), member of the Reichstag
 Wilhelm Michler (1846-1899), chemist
  (1866-1933), Holocaust victim
Ernst Stuhlinger (1913-2008), rocket scientist
  (born 1946), mayor, politician (CDU), Member of the Landtag of Baden-Württemberg
  (born 1956), writer, literary critic and essayist

References

External links

  

Main-Tauber-Kreis
Württemberg
Historic Jewish communities